Psalm 32 is the 32nd psalm of the Book of Psalms, beginning in English in the King James Version: "Blessed is he whose transgression is forgiven". The Book of Psalms is part of the third section of the Hebrew Bible, and a book of the Christian Old Testament. In the slightly different numbering system used in the Greek Septuagint and Latin Vulgate translations of the Bible, this psalm is Psalm 31. In Latin, it is known by the incipit, "". The psalmist (traditionally, King David) expresses the joy of being released from great suffering.
 
Psalm 32 is used in both Jewish and Christian liturgies. It has often been set to music.

Text

Hebrew Bible version 
The following is the Hebrew text of Psalm 32:

King James Version 
 Blessed is he whose transgression is forgiven, whose sin is covered.
 Blessed is the man unto whom the Lord imputeth not iniquity, and in whose spirit there is no guile.
 When I kept silence, my bones waxed old through my roaring all the day long.
 For day and night thy hand was heavy upon me: my moisture is turned into the drought of summer. Selah.
 I acknowledge my sin unto thee, and mine iniquity have I not hid. I said, I will confess my transgressions unto the Lord; and thou forgavest the iniquity of my sin. Selah.
 For this shall every one that is godly pray unto thee in a time when thou mayest be found: surely in the floods of great waters they shall not come nigh unto him.
 Thou art my hiding place; thou shalt preserve me from trouble; thou shalt compass me about with songs of deliverance. Selah.
 I will instruct thee and teach thee in the way which thou shalt go: I will guide thee with mine eye.
 Be ye not as the horse, or as the mule, which have no understanding: whose mouth must be held in with bit and bridle, lest they come near unto thee.
 Many sorrows shall be to the wicked: but he that trusteth in the Lord, mercy shall compass him about.
 Be glad in the Lord, and rejoice, ye righteous: and shout for joy, all ye that are upright in heart.

Theme and structure 
The psalmist (traditionally, King David) expresses the joy of being released from great suffering. The psalm is divided into two parts: in verses 1–5, the psalmist proclaims the joy of seeing his fault remitted by God, and in verse 6 to verse 11, he shows his confidence in the conviction that God is the guide on the right path. The harm suffered by the psalmist is very hard to bear, although we can not know precisely its nature. The psalmist seeks to understand where it comes from, because at the time, misfortune was understood as a consequence of the sins one has committed. But far from being an opportunity to revolt, this event leads him to experience God's forgiveness.

This Psalm is one of the seven penitential psalms, as its focus is on the former sins of the psalmist. It is one of the psalms known as a maschil, meaning "enlightened" or "wise", and the Jerusalem Bible describes it as a "didactic psalm". The psalm itself is not a prayer of repentance, but a confession of sin is consummated. It also touches on themes of wisdom poetry, and belongs to the series of psalms of thanksgiving of an individual. According to James Luther Mays, the Psalmist, in the exercise of repentance teaches others of his experience and gives therefore instructions. It is divided into the following segments: 
1. Verse 1: Commitment to repentance
2. Verse 3-5: The psalmist's distress
3. Verse 6: Forgiveness and admonition to others
4. Verse 8: Wisdom speech
5. Verse 10: Summary of experience
6. Verse 11: Rejoicing over the forgiveness of sins.

Uses

Judaism
The psalm is recited on Yom Kippur in some traditions.
Psalm 32 is one of the ten Psalms of the Tikkun HaKlali of Rebbe Nachman of Breslov.
Verse 8 is found in the "Foundation of Repentance" recited on the eve of Rosh Hashanah.

New Testament
Paul the Apostle references verses 1 and 2 of the Psalm in Romans , in his explanation of salvation by faith, not works of the Mosaic Law.

Catholic Church
Following St. Benedict of Nursia, the practice in the Middle Ages was for monasteries to recite or sing this Psalm at matins on Sundays. Today, Psalm 31 is sung or recited at Vespers on the Thursday of the first week of the main four-weekly cycle of liturgical prayers.

Book of Common Prayer
In the Church of England's Book of Common Prayer, this psalm is appointed to be read on the evening of the sixth day of the month.

Musical settings 
Heinrich Schütz wrote a setting of a paraphrase of the psalm in German, "Der Mensch vor Gott wohl selig ist", SWV 129, for the Becker Psalter, published first in 1628.

References

Further reading
 John Barton, John Muddiman (eds.), The Oxford Bible Commentary, Oxford University Press, 2001, p. 377.

External links

 
 
  in Hebrew and English - Mechon-mamre
 Text of Psalm 28 according to the 1928 Psalter
 Of David. A maskil. / Blessed is the one whose fault is removed, whose sin is forgiven. text and footnotes, usccb.org United States Conference of Catholic Bishops
 Psalm 32:1 introduction and text, biblestudytools.com
 Psalm 32 – The Blessings of Forgiveness, Protection, and Guidance enduringword.com
 Psalm 32 / Refrain: Be glad, you righteous, and rejoice in the Lord. Church of England
 Psalm 32 at biblegateway.com
 Hymns for Psalm 32 hymnary.org

032
Works attributed to David